WABK-FM (104.3 MHz) is a commercial FM radio station licensed to Gardiner, Maine, and serving Augusta and Central Maine.  It airs a classic hits radio format.   WABK-FM is part of a three-way simulcast with FM 104.7 WBAK Belfast and FM 107.7 WBKA Bar Harbor.  They are owned by Blueberry Broadcasting with studios and offices on Target Industrial Circle in Bangor.

WABK-FM has an effective radiated power of 50,000 watts.  Its transmitter is off Winthrop Street in Hallowell.

History
WABK first signed on as an AM station, in the fall of 1968.  It aired an adult leaning Top 40 format on 1280 kHz (today WHTP).  WABK-FM signed on during the summer of 1974 with the call letters WKME and featured Drake-Chenault's automated "Hit Parade" format.  In February 1978, the original studios in Farmingdale were destroyed by fire.
 

As the stations rebuilt, WKME's call sign was changed to WABK-FM.  Both the AM and FM stations began simulcasting an up-tempo full service adult contemporary format with an emphasis on local personalities, news and community involvement.  The simulcast ended in 1983 when WABK 1280 changed its format to country music.  It later tried oldies, then adult standards and finally in the late 1990s switched to sports radio with the call letters WFAU.  In 1994, WABK-FM became "Oldies 104" but gradually shed the oldies image, playing more 1970s and 1980s music and billing itself as "Super Hits 104 WABK."

In January 2013, WABK-FM rebranded as "Big 104 FM," airing a classic hits format.  It also began simulcasting on FM 104.7 WBAK Belfast and FM 107.7 WBKA Bar Harbor. . From August 30, 2013 to July 26, 2016, the call sign on 104.3 in Gardiner was modified to WABK, without the "-FM" suffix.

In 2014, the former WABI/WAEI at 910 AM in Bangor was added to the simulcast.  In 2016, the AM's station's call letters were switched to WABK, and 104.3 WABK once again added the "-FM" suffix to its call sign. In January 2019, 910 AM dropped WABK-FM's programming and became WTOS, a simulcast of WTOS-FM.

References

External links

ABK-FM
Classic hits radio stations in the United States
Radio stations established in 1974
Gardiner, Maine
Mass media in Kennebec County, Maine
Blueberry Broadcasting radio stations
1974 establishments in Maine